The Dream Kids is a 2013 French comedy-drama film directed by Vianney Lebasque.

Plot 
JB, 16 years old prodigy, is the latest to join the training center where evolve the greatest hopes of football. Between friendship, competition, rivalry and his attraction to Lila, a young girl passionate by the street art, JB will have to fight despite the dark secret that could prevent him from achieving his dream.

Cast 

 Paul Bartel as JB
 Margot Bancilhon as Lila
 Reda Kateb as Reza
 Eddy Mitchell as Coach
 Samy Seghir as Selim
 Olivier Rabourdin as Christian
 Adel Bencherif as Sofiane
 Ralph Amoussou as El Malah
 Ahmed Dramé as Nimo
 Mathias Mlekuz as Guy
 Clément Solignac as Steve
 Antoine Bujoli as Wu
 Robert Abogo as Roger
 François Deblock as Piwi
 Amélie Chavaudra as Anais
 Sidwell Weber as Juliette
 Cédric Ben Abdallah as Mickael
 Paola Guidicelli as Constance

Awards and nominations
 Paul Bartel is Nominated to the César Award for Most Promising Actor

References

External links 

2013 films
French comedy-drama films
2013 comedy-drama films
2010s French films